The Chehalis River may refer to:

Chehalis River (Washington), in the United States
Chehalis River (British Columbia), in Canada

See also
Chehalis (disambiguation)